Carenum porphyreum is a species of ground beetle in the subfamily Scaritinae. It was described by Henry Walter Bates in 1874.

References

porphyreum
Beetles described in 1874